Cerge for Truth is a current affairs and talk television show in the Philippines hosted by Cerge Remonde, and aired every Tuesday evenings on Radio Philippines Network.

Hosts
 Cerge Remonde (2003–2007)

See also
List of Philippine television shows
List of programs previously broadcast by Radio Philippines Network

Philippine television talk shows
RPN News and Public Affairs shows
Radio Philippines Network original programming
2003 Philippine television series debuts
2007 Philippine television series endings